Wargaming Group Limited (also known as Wargaming.net) is a global video game company headquartered in Nicosia, Cyprus. The group operates across more than 16 offices and development studios globally. Initially focused on turn-based strategy and real-time strategy games, Wargaming switched to developing free-to-play online action games in 2009, including the military-themed team-based game World of Tanks, and later World of Warships, World of Warplanes, and World of Tanks Blitz.

History 

Wargaming was founded by Victor Kislyi in Minsk on 2 August 1998, intending the company as a developer of strategy video games. The company's first project was DBA Online—the digital version of a miniature tabletop rule set De Bellis Antiquitatis—launched in 2000. Wargaming started working on its first full-scale commercial project—the sci-fi turn-based strategy game Massive Assault, in March 2002. Over the course of five years, the company shipped five projects within the Massive Assault franchise.

On 16 November 2007, Wargaming acquired the Minsk-based developer Arise. In December 2008, the company released its first real-time strategy Operation Bagration. On 16 April 2009, Wargaming started working on real-time strategy game Order of War. It was published by Square Enix on 18 September 2009. On 12 August 2010, the company released its first online title, World of Tanks. On 12 April 2011, World of Tanks was released in North America and Europe.

In 2011, Wargaming relocated its headquarters from Minsk to Nicosia, Cyprus. Since 17 August 2015, these headquarters are located in the Wargaming HQ building, formerly known as the President building, located near the Presidential Palace in Nicosia. European operations headquarters, known as Wargaming Europe, were established in Paris, France, in July 2011. On 3 August 2011, the company created a direct presence in North America by opening an office in San Francisco. At E3 2011, Wargaming announced the follow-up to World of Tanks, the flight combat online action game World of Warplanes. At Gamescom 2011, the company unveiled the third part of its military saga—the naval action online game World of Warships. In October 2011, Wargaming announced the online collectible card MMO game World of Tanks: Generals. Throughout 2011, Wargaming joined strategic partnerships with Persha Studia, Lesta Studio and DAVA Consulting, with each operating separate projects under Wargaming.

On 21 February 2012, the Android version of World of Tanks Assistant, the mobile application for World of Tanks, went live in Europe and North America. In May 2012, Wargaming entered the Korean games market by opening a subsidiary office in Seoul. Wargaming embarked on a rebranding initiative and announced the Wargaming.net service, which will unite its games and services into a single battle universe in June 2012. On 7 August 2012, Wargaming acquired Australian company BigWorld Technology which brought development of the middleware for its MMO projects in-house. In an annual report for the Cyprus Stock Exchange (CSE) in 2012, Wargaming's revenue was declared to be 217.9 million Euro, with a net profit of 6.1 million Euro. Wargaming's shares were delisted from the CSE in 2015, and it remains a privately held company to date.

Wargaming moved into the console market by acquiring Day 1 Studios on 29 January 2013.  Renamed Wargaming Chicago-Baltimore, the studios are currently developing World of Tanks: Xbox 360 Edition (February 2014), Xbox One (July 2015) and PlayStation 4 (January 2016). On 12 February 2013, Wargaming announced its own esports league, the Wargaming.net League. The company acquired Gas Powered Games on 14 February 2013. On 26 March 2013, Wargaming announced World of Tanks Blitz, a mobile MMO game centered around tank combat available for smartphones and tablets. The game was released on iOS in June 2014. As of 2016, World of Tanks Blitz is available on iOS, Android, Windows 10 and Mac OS X. Wargaming branched into the Japanese games market by opening an office in Tokyo on 29 May 2013. On 22 July 2013, the company bought Total Annihilation and Master of Orion intellectual properties from the Atari bankruptcy proceedings.

In July 2015, Wargaming launched WG Labs as a division that would act as a third-party publisher to outside developers. The creation of the division was primarily driven by Wargaming's partnership with independent studio NGD Studios and their game, Master of Orion. In October, the company also rebranded DropForge, a Bellevue, Washington-based mobile game studio founded in 2013 by David Bluhm, as WG Cells. WG Cells was shut down in August 2016.

Wargaming's WG Labs division released a reimagining of Master of Orion in August 2016. The game was developed by the Argentine NGD Studios. In November 2016 Wargaming, SEGA and Creative Assembly announced a new strategic partnership that will see Total War: ARENA published worldwide. As of 2016, Wargaming owns a significant share of the Hellenic Bank (Daniel S. Loeb's Third Point Group is the other major shareholder of the Cyprus-based Bank) and has shown an interest in purchasing land property assets in Cyprus for its use and investment purposes. Wargaming has become the largest taxpayer within Cyprus.

In 2017, Wargaming started a mobile games division called Wargaming Mobile.

Controversies 

In May 2017, Wargaming found itself amidst controversy when it was claimed that one of its employees had threatened to file a Digital Millennium Copyright Act (DMCA) claim against YouTube gaming content creator SirFoch over his scathing review of a World of Tanks premium tank, they apologised later though. 

In February 2018, Wargaming America closed its Emeryville offices, cutting 100 jobs.

In May 2018, Wargaming's CEO showed up personally to close their Seattle studio and lay off over 150 developers.

Alleged immigration fraud 
In November 2020, the Cypriot government announced an investigation into possible passport fraud, where Wargaming employees were granted "Golden Passports" (faster Cypriot citizenship in exchange for monetary investments in the country) on fraudulent grounds, 27 of which were found to be non-compliant with the program's criteria, including having filed using fake addresses (assigned to parking lots, empty land, etc.). In December that year Ministry of Finance of Cyprus studied the report on that matter by an audit service and stated, that "findings of the report in are judged to be completely misleading and inaccurate, while they are full of untruths and conclusions that do not correspond to reality at all".

Lootboxes fraud and gambling 
In August 2021, Wargaming found itself amidst controversy once again when a large part of the "Community Contributors" (a form of associate program) walked out in protest over the over-proliferation of lootboxes and gambling mechanics in World of Warships, paired with the chronic abhorrent treatment of them and the players by the developers at Lesta Studio in the last few years. In the wake of the walking out of the CC, an employee nicknamed "Gneisenau013" of the Texas office was terminated. However, said employee was not involved in the entire situation, but merely a scapegoat . In protest of this behavior, a senior manager for World of Tanks resigned, stating that the displayed behavior of the senior World of Warships management is "cowardly, contemptible and shitbird-like"

2022 Russian invasion of Ukraine 
On February 26, 2022, amidst the 2022 Russian invasion of Ukraine, Creative Director of Wargaming Sergey Burkatovskiy was fired, following comments in support of the Russian invasion that he posted to his Facebook page. Following his termination, Wargaming made the statement that "Sergey is an employee of the company and expressed his personal opinion, which categorically does not coincide with the position of the company. All our staff are now focused on helping out our over 550 colleagues from Kyiv and their families... Sergei's opinion is in complete contradiction with the company's position. He is no longer an employee of Wargaming."

On April 4, 2022, Wargaming announced the closure of all operations in Russia and Belarus, stating on their official website that following "strategic review of business operations" they would be separating themselves from Lesta Studio, a former Wargaming Studio based in St. Petersburg, effective March 31, and are in the process of closing their studio in Minsk. The company also noted they expect "substantial losses" because of the decision.

On December 30, 2022, Nikolai Katselapov, the chief business development officer was added to the list of "organisations and individuals involved in terrorist activities" by Belarus KGB. According to PC Gamer, the list "has long been used as a political bludgeon" by Belarus.

Studios 
 Wargaming Kyiv (Persha Studia) in Kyiv, Ukraine; founded in 2000, acquired in 2011.
 Wargaming SAS in Paris, France; acquired in 2011
 Wargaming Chicago-Baltimore in Chicago, Illinois, and Baltimore, Maryland, U.S.; founded as Day 1 Studios, acquired and renamed in January 2013.
 Wargaming Mobile; established in June 2017.
 Wargaming Berlin in Berlin, Germany; established in 2017.
 DPS Games in Guildford, England; established as Wargaming UK in September 2018, renamed in September 2020.
 Edge Case Games in Guildford, England; founded in 2014, acquired and merged in November 2018.
 Wargaming Vilnius in Vilnius, Lithuania; established in April 2021.
 Wargaming Belgrade in Belgrade, Serbia; established in June 2022.
 Wargaming Warsaw in Warsaw, Poland; established in June 2022.

Former 
 Wargaming Seattle in Redmond, Washington, U.S.; founded as Gas Powered Games in May 1998, acquired in February 2013, renamed in March 2013, and closed down in 2018.
 Wargaming Helsinki in Helsinki, Finland; founded as Boomlagoon in 2012, acquired and renamed in December 2016, closed in October 2019.
 Wargaming Copenhagen in Copenhagen, Denmark; founded as Hapti.co as a subsidiary of IO Interactive, acquired and renamed in September 2017, sold to Rovio Entertainment in 2020.
 Lesta Studio in Saint-Petersburg, Russia; acquired in 2011. No longer affiliated with Wargaming as of April 2022.
 Wargaming Minsk in Minsk, Belarus; the original and largest studio of Wargaming, established in 1998, withdrawn in 2022.
 Wargaming Moscow in Moscow, Russia; established in October 2017, withdrawn in 2022.
 Wargaming Sydney in Sydney, Australia; acquired in August 2012, sold to Riot Games in October 2022.

Games developed

Activism 

Wargaming is involved in a number of projects to preserve military cultural heritage, including:
 The restoration of the sole surviving Maus super-heavy tank together with the Russian Kubinka Tank Museum. The museum later published an open letter saying: "The Central Museum of Armored Vehicles of the Ministry of Defense of the Russian Federation officially states that the information on the restoration works on the tank “Maus”, which appeared in various mass media, is not true."
 The recovery of the world's last remaining Dornier Do 17, now on display at the Royal Air Force Museum in Cosford, United Kingdom.
 The Wargaming Education Center at the Tank Museum at Bovington, United Kingdom.
 Annual Memorial Day events in North America. Donating revenue from select in-app purchases to charities, including AMVETS, Homes for Our Troops, and Military Families Fund.
Fundraising for restoration projects at the Tank Museum at Bovington, United Kingdom. Proceeds from special premium shop packages are donated to the museum and used to restore the museum's current fleet of operational vehicles and to buy the highly specialised tools required to service them.
 A 25-hour streaming marathon at Wargaming West to raise money for children's hospitals and other children's charities (November 2013).
 The Grace After Fire charity stream in North America. Assisting women veterans transitioning from military service, providing resources and a space to connect, renew, and heal.
 Restored one of four remaining AC-1 Sentinel tanks, now located in the Australian Armor & Artillery Museum, Cairns (March 2016).

On 1 November 2017, the World of Warships team organized a fundraiser to support the USS Texas Museum that was in severe financial need after the floods caused by Hurricane Harvey. Special bundles with USS Texas battleship were offered to players on NA, EU and SEA servers, and all of the proceeds from this sale were donated to Battleship Texas Foundation. On top of this, USS Texas battleship was offered as a free referral prize for the newcomers invited by veteran players. World of Warships donated $25 to Battleship Texas Foundation for each qualifying referral during this charitable campaign on top of the proceeds from bundle sales. As of 1 December 2019, over $280,000 was raised by World of Warships community for the battleship preservation efforts.

On 16 November 2019, Wargaming partnered with Muskogee War Memorial Park in Oklahoma to raise money to save the USS Batfish (SS-310) submarine, with the goal of helping the museum reach $150,000 to cover the necessary repairs. To raise money, a charity stream went live on Twitch. Unique patches were made available for purchase in the game with all proceeds from sales going directly to the USS Batfish preservation efforts. This initiative helped raise $45,000.

On 14 December 2019, Wargaming announced a Save the Children 24-hour charity stream, aiming to raise $25,000 before the clock ran out.

VR and AR content 
As part of its simulation initiatives, Wargaming is exploring virtual and augmented reality technologies. In early 2015, the company worked with Google to record and portray a 1941 battle in 360° for the Google Cardboard mobile HMD. This was followed by a series of panoramic tours of WWII tanks, Virtually Inside the Tanks Retrieved, filmed in co-operation with Google and The Tank Museum in Bovington. Available via the Littlstar VR cinema network, the series currently includes the T-34-76, the M4 Sherman "Fury" from the Brad Pitt movie of the same name, the Type 59, Leopard 1, and the Chieftain. Each video also offers a tour with Wargaming military specialists Richard Cutland and Nicolas Moran.

To honour Victory Day, Wargaming released the War Knows No Nation video. The video rekindles the memories of three veteran World War II tankers, blending live action panorama footage with CG scenes for the very first time. In spring 2016, Wargaming worked with the National Museum of the Royal Navy, Portsmouth Historic Dockyard and honoured the anniversary of the Battle of Jutland with an augmented reality app: HMS Caroline  AR Experience. To congratulate Russians on Navy Day, Wargaming created a PortHub augmented reality mobile app that allowed users take snapshots with warships. As part of the 100 Years of Tanks celebration, Wargaming presented the Virtually inside the First Tanks 360° video that featured a walkthrough of Bovington's collection of early tanks, enhanced by World of Tanks in-game scenes and the free Tank 100 mobile app. Another in its range of 360° videos, Virtual Inside the Warships, features  amongst others.

Awards 
Wargaming has achieved valued awards in the EU and US.

 Best Game Developer Award at GDC Russia 2009 (KRI-2009)
 Media Award at GDC Russia 2009 (KRI-2009)
 Best Game Developer Award at GDC Russia 2010 (KRI-2010)
 Special Award from the Industry at GDC Russia 2011 (KRI-2011)
 Industry Excellence Award at GDC Russia 2012 (KRI-2012)
 Best Game Developer Award at GDC Russia 2012 (KRI-2012)

References

External links 

 

Belarusian companies established in 1998
Video game companies established in 1998
Video game development companies
Video game companies of Belarus
Video game companies of Cyprus
Software companies of Belarus
Software companies of Cyprus
Companies based in Nicosia
Companies based in Minsk
Belarusian brands